A Tory holds a political philosophy (Toryism) based on the traditionalism and conservatism, originally from the Cavalier faction in the English Civil War.

It may also refer to:

Given name

Female
Tory Marie Arnberger, American politician
Tory Burch (born 1966), American fashion designer
Tory Christman (born 1947), American critic
Tory Dent (1958–2005), American poet
Tory Fretz (born 1942), American tennis player
Tory Gavito, American attorney
Tory Lane (born 1982), American fetish model
Tory Mussett (born 1978), Australian actress
Tory Shepherd, Australian writer
Tory Tunnell, American producer
Tory Whanau (born 1983), New Zealand politician

Male
Tory Baucum (born 1960), American Anglican priest
Tory Bellici (born 1970), American TV personality
Tory Bruno (born 1961), CEO of the United Launch Alliance
Tory Carter (born 1999), American football player
Tory Cassis, Canadian singer
Tory Collins (born 1982), American football player
Tory Dickson (born 1987), Australian rules footballer
Tory Dobrin, American artistic director
Tory Epps (1967–2005), American football player
Tory Harrison (born 1987), American footballer
Tory Humphrey (born 1983), American football tight end
Tory James (born 1973), American football player
Tory Kittles (born 1975), American actor
Tory Lanez (born 1992), Canadian rapper
Tory Nixon (born 1962), American football player
Tory Nyhaug (born 1992), Olympic athlete
Tory Pragassa (born 1996), Kenyan swimmer
Tory Rocca (born 1973), American lawyer
Tory Rushton (born 1979), Canadian politician
Tory Verdi, American basketball coach
Tory Woodbury (born 1978), American football player

Surname
 Geoffroy Tory (c.1480–1533), French humanist and engraver
 Henry Marshall Tory (1864–1967), Canadian university administrator
 James Cranswick Tory (1862–1944), Canadian lawyer and politician
 John A. Tory (1930–2011), Canadian lawyer and father of John H. Tory
 John Tory (born 1954), former Leader of the Ontario Progressive Conservative Party, and currently the Mayor of Toronto
 John S. D. Tory (1903–1965), Canadian lawyer and father of John A. Tory

Fictional characters
 Tory Boy

Other
 Tory, from Tóraidhe, Irish Catholic soldiers in the mid-1600s who fought for the Confederation of Kilkenny
 Tory, referring to the Loyalist faction in the American Revolution.

Other uses
 Tory Redding, the female protagonist of the 1993 film Leprechaun, played by Jennifer Aniston
 Tory Creek (disambiguation)
 Tory Island, an island off the north-west coast of Ireland
 Tory, a ship of the New Zealand Company in 1839–1840
 , chartered by the Hudson's Bay Company from 1851–1852, see Hudson's Bay Company vessels
 Torys, a Canadian law firm and a member of the Bay Street Seven Sisters
 Tory, the code name of a nuclear reactor developed for Project Pluto
 Conservative Party (UK), a British political party colloquially referred to as the Tories
 Conservative Party of Canada, a Canadian political party colloquially referred to as the Tories

See also
 Tori (name)
 Tory Party (disambiguation)
 Torey, given name and surname
 Torry (disambiguation)
 Torny Pedersen

English-language unisex given names